Netechma bifascia is a species of moth of the family Tortricidae. It is found in Cotopaxi Province, Ecuador.

The wingspan is 22.5 mm. The ground colour of the forewings is cream ferruginous with brownish suffusions. The hindwings are dirty cream with pale brownish-grey strigulation (fine streaks).

Etymology
The species name refers to the forewing fasciae and is derived from Latin bi (meaning double).

References

Moths described in 2008
Netechma